Brahic may refer to:

 3488 Brahic, main-belt asteroid
 André Brahic (1942–2016), a French astrophysicist
 Beverley Bie Brahic, a Canadian poet and translator
 Brahic, a small village in Les Vans, southern France